Leo Butler (born 1974 in Sheffield) is a British playwright. His plays have been staged, among others, by the Royal Court, the Royal Shakespeare Company and the Almeida Theatre. His plays have been published by Bloomsbury A & C Black. His 2001 play Redundant won the George Devine Award.  Between 2005 and 2014 he was Playwriting Tutor for the Royal Court Young Writers Programme.

Plays

Made of Stone (2000) premiered as part of the Young Writers' Festival at Royal Court Theatre, directed by Deborah Bruce
Redundant (2001) premiered at Royal Court Theatre, directed by Dominic Cooke
Devotion (2002) produced by Theatre Centre premiered at Redbridge Drama Centre, directed by Liam Steel
Lucky Dog (2004) premiered at Royal Court Theatre, directed by James Macdonald
The Early Bird (2006) premiered at Queen's Theatre in the Belfast Festival, directed by Rachel O'Riordan
Heroes (2007) premiered by touring with the National Theatre, directed by Samantha Potter
Airbag (2007) a collaboration with Nigerian choreographer Anthony Odey, premiered as a Rough Cut at the Royal Court Theatre
I'll Be The Devil (2008) produced by the Royal Shakespeare Company, premiered at Tricycle Theatre, directed by Ramin Gray
Faces In The Crowd (2008) premiered at Royal Court Theatre, directed by Clare Lizzimore
Juicy Fruits (2011) produced by Paines Plough, premiered at Oran Mor, directed by George Perrin
 Alison! : A Rock Opera (2012) co-written with Dan Persad premiered at King's Head Theatre, directed by Nick Bagnall
 Could You Please Close The Door Please? (2012) premiered at Berlin Schaubuhne as part of the Festival of International Drama.
 Sixty-Nine (2012) premiered at The Pleasance Courtyard, Edinburgh Festival Fringe, directed by Donnacadh O'Briain
 Do It! (2013) premiered at Royal Court Theatre Open Court Season, directed by Ned Bennett.
 Boy (2016) premiered at the Almeida Theatre, directed by Sacha Wares
 Decades (2016) premiered at the Ovalhouse theatre, produced and performed by the BRIT School, directed by Eva Sampson.
 Woyzeck (2018) an adaptation of Georg Buchner's original play premiered at Birmingham Repertory Theatre, directed by Roxana Silbert.
 All You Need Is LSD (2018) produced by Told By An Idiot theatre company, premiered at Birmingham Repertory Theatre, directed by Paul Hunter and Stephen Harper.
 Meet Mo (2020) short musical composed by Leo Butler, produced online by Theatre Royal Stratford East, directed by Eva Sampson.
 Cinderella (2022) book and lyrics by Leo Butler, music and lyrics by Robert Hyman, produced by Theatre Royal Stratford East, directed by Eva Sampson.
 Innocent Creatures (2023) produced by National Theatre Connections.

Film

Self Made (2011 feature) co-written with Gillian Wearing, UK Film Council/Northern Film & Media, premiered at the London Film Festival 2011.

Television

Jerusalem the Golden (2002) single drama produced by BBC Four/Fictionlab, directed by Louis Caulfield, starring Rudolph Walker and Eddie Marsan.

Music
Alison! A Rock Opera (2012) a rock opera, written by Leo Butler and Dan Persad. 
 The Collective Psychosis of the 21st Century (2017) an album of songs written & performed by Leo Butler and Dan Persad

Notes

1974 births
Living people
Writers from Sheffield
English dramatists and playwrights
Alumni of Rose Bruford College
English male dramatists and playwrights